The Palace Hotel Residential Tower was a residential skyscraper proposed in 2006, which was to have been built at the corner of Jessie & Annie Streets in the South of Market district of San Francisco, California. At  and 60 stories, it would have been the tallest residential building in the city, and the tallest South of Market. Had it been constructed, prior to the Financial crisis of 2007–2008, the tower would have replaced an annex of the Palace Hotel.

See also

 San Francisco's tallest buildings

 San Francisco Transbay development

References

Proposed buildings and structures in California
Proposed skyscrapers in the United States
Residential skyscrapers in San Francisco
Skyscraper hotels in San Francisco
South of Market, San Francisco